Kachimayu (Quechua kachi salt, mayu river, "salt river", hispanicized spellings Cachimayo or Cachi) is a river in Peru located in the regions Ayacucho and Huancavelica. It is an affluent of the Mantaro River.

Kachimayu originates in the Huamanga Province. First it flows along the border of the provinces Angaraes and Huamanga until reaching the Huanta Province. Then it turns to the north following the border of the provinces Angaraes and Huanta. East of Marcas the Urubamba River of the Angaraes Province joins Kachimayu. The confluence with the Mantaro River is near Tinkuy (Tincoy) and Allqumach'ay (Alcomachay).

See also 
 Pampaqucha

References

Rivers of Peru
Rivers of Ayacucho Region
Rivers of Huancavelica Region